Philotheca thryptomenoides is a species of flowering plant in the family Rutaceae and is endemic to the south-west of Western Australia. It is a small undershrub with oval to club-shaped leaves and white flowers with a broad, reddish-brown stripe, arranged singly on the ends of branchlets.

Description
The ten stamens are free from each other and densely hairy.

Taxonomy
This species was first described in 1920 by Spencer Le Marchant Moore who gave it the name Erisotemon thryptomenoides in the Journal of the Linnean Society, Botany. In 1998, Paul Wilson changed the name to Philotheca thryptomenoides in the journal Nuytsia.

Distribution and habitat
This philotheca grows in shrubland on heavy soil in the Merredin-Wubin area in the south-west of Western Australia.

Conservation status
Philotheca thryptomenoides is classified as "not threatened" by the Government of Western Australia Department of Parks and Wildlife.

References

Plants described in 1920
Rosids of Western Australia
thryptomenoides
Sapindales of Australia
Taxa named by Spencer Le Marchant Moore